Rosario Martinelli (11 October 1941 – 19 October 2013) was an Italian professional football player who played as a midfielder.

Martinelli has won 6 Swiss Super League and 5 Swiss Cups. He arrived in Zürich at the age of 17, and was known for his all-round play and technical ability.

Honours
Zürich
 Swiss Super League: 1962–63, 1965–66, 1967–68, 1973–74, 1974–75, 1975–76
Swiss Cup: 1965–66, 1969–70, 1971–72, 1972–73, 1975–76

References

External links
 DbFCZ Profile

Italian footballers
Swiss Super League players
FC Zürich players
FC Chiasso players
Association football midfielders
Italian expatriate footballers
Expatriate footballers in Switzerland
Italian expatriate sportspeople in Switzerland
1941 births
2013 deaths
Footballers from Bergamo
Italian football managers
FC Zürich managers
Italian expatriate football managers
Expatriate football managers in Switzerland